American director and producer Michael Bay started his career directing music videos and commercials. This included a commercial for the American Red Cross in 1992 which received a Clio Award, and music videos for Donny Osmond, Styx and Meat Loaf. Jerry Bruckheimer recognizing his achievements on commercials offered the chance to direct one of his productions as Bay's feature film debut. Bay did so with Bruckheimer's action comedy Bad Boys starring Will Smith, and Martin Lawrence. In the same year he also received a Directors Guild of America Award for his work on commercials. Bay followed this with action film The Rock starring Sean Connery, and Nicolas Cage. The film was a commercial success grossing over $335 million at the worldwide box office. In 1998, he directed, and produced the science fiction disaster film Armageddon which was the highest-grossing film of the year, and Bay received the Saturn Award for Best Director. After the success of Armageddon he also became the youngest director to gross $1 billion at the worldwide box office.

Three years later he directed and produced the war film Pearl Harbor (2001) which was negatively received by critics but grossed over $449 million at the box office. Later in the same year, Bay founded his own production company Platinum Dunes with Brad Fuller, and Andrew Form. In 2003, Bay directed the action comedy sequel Bad Boys II which saw Smith and Lawrence reprise their roles. Two years later he directed science fiction action film The Island (2005), and produced the horror remake The Amityville Horror (2005).

In 2007, Bay directed, and produced the first film in the live-action Transformers film series based on the toy line of the same name. It was a commercial success grossing over $709 million at the box office. He followed this by directing its sequel Transformers: Revenge of the Fallen (2009). The film drew negative reception from critics but grossed over $836 million at the box office. The third instalment in the series Transformers: Dark of the Moon (2011) became the first of his films to gross over $1 billion at the box office. Two years later Bay directed and produced crime comedy Pain & Gain (2013). From 2014-2017 he executive produced the popular pirate series Black Sails for STARZ which purported to be a prequel to Robert Louis Stevenson’s Treasure Island. In 2014, he directed, and produced a fourth Transformer film, Transformers: Age of Extinction, which grossed over $1 billion at the box office, and was the highest-grossing film at the worldwide box office that year. Three years later, he directed the fifth entry in the Transformers film series, Transformers: The Last Knight which received generally negative reviews from critics and was the lowest-grossing worldwide in the franchise's history.

Film

Films produced

Acting

Other credits

Television
Executive producer

Acting roles

References

External links
 

American filmographies
Director filmographies
Michael Bay